Jalan Lapangan Terbang Baru Bintulu, or New Bintulu Airport Road, Federal Route 920, is a federal road in Bintulu Division, Sarawak, Malaysia.

At most sections, the Federal Route 920 was built under the JKR R5 road standard, with a speed limit of 90 km/h.

List of junctions and towns

Pan Borneo Highway project 
Jalan Lapangan Terbang Baru Bintulu is included in the Pan Borneo Highway project and it was apprehended by the turnkey contractor, Lebuhraya Bonreo Utara Sdn Bhd (LBU). It was included in the work package contract (WPC)s 09 (To Sg Arip Bridge, Selangau) & 10 (To Nyabau & Bakun, Bintulu & Sg. Tangap, Miri). The main contractors of this project are KKBWCT Joint Venture Sdn Bhd & Pekerjaan Piasau Konkerit Sdn Bhd (PPK).

References

Malaysian Federal Roads